Bjarte Birkeland (26 December 1920 – 7 April 2000) was a Norwegian literary researcher.

He was born in Fana. In 1950 and 1976 he published works about Olav Duun; in 1962 he took the dr.philos. degree with a thesis about Per Sivle. He edited the Nynorsk periodical Syn og Segn from 1960 to 1968, and was a professor at the University of Bergen from 1969 to 1984.

References

1920 births
2000 deaths
Norwegian literary historians
Academic staff of the University of Bergen
Nynorsk-language writers
20th-century Norwegian historians